Relations between the Church of Jesus Christ of Latter-day Saints (LDS Church) and the natives of the Pacific Island groups of Polynesia, Melanesia, Micronesia, and surrounding island groups are quite complex.

History

The Pacific islands were one of the first areas to be evangelized after Europe and North America, notably Hawaii, which fell under American influence and was annexed by the United States quite early on.

On November 27, 1919, the Laie Hawaii Temple was the first temple outside the continental United States and also the first in Polynesia.

In 1955, the church began ordaining Melanesians to the priesthood, and on September 26, the Brigham Young University–Hawaii was established.

The church allowed Pacific Islanders to hold the priesthood, and church president David O. McKay clarified that native Fijians and Australian Aboriginals could also be ordained to the priesthood.

Hagoth

In addition to the LDS Church's stories about people sailing to the New World, there is also the story of Hagoth, who it is said to have sailed from the Americas to Polynesia. But while the stories of Lehi and Jared are generally accepted, that of Hagoth is more ambiguous and not universally supported by practising church members, and not at all by non-members of the church. Differentiating between scriptural and apocryphal accounts of Hagoth and his ships, one Latter-day Saint writer makes the following observations:

The Book of Mormon does not equate the "west sea" with the Pacific Ocean. The Book of Mormon does not tell us that Hagoth was on board any of the ships that were lost. Scripture does not say that he captained a vessel or that he was an explorer or an adventurer, or that he led people. For all we can tell, the skilled Hagoth's main objective was to profit from the shipping industry. It is possible for peoples in various places to be related to Hagoth's people (the Nephites) without Hagoth personally making an ocean voyage. Coastal and Island hopping colonies, once associated with Nephite shipping, could have built more vessels and traveled very far. It is also important to realize that the peoples of the Pacific islands may have come from more than one direction.

Non-scriptural sources suggest that Hagoth led an expedition, sailing into the Pacific Ocean from the Americas. Leaders of the LDS Church and LDS scholars have stated that the peoples of the Pacific Islands, including Hawaii, Polynesia, and New Zealand, are descendants of the Nephite Hagoth and his supposed followers. According to the Book of Mormon, the Nephites were descendants of Israel. Many members of the LDS Church in Polynesia have come to believe that Hagoth is their ancestor.

Folklore

Some of the folklore that exists in the relationship of the LDS Church and Pacific Islanders include:
 that Tāwhiao accurately predicted the site of the 1958 Hamilton New Zealand Temple before his death in 1894;
 that Māori prophets or chieftains, including Paora Te Potangaroa and Tāwhiao, predicted the coming of Latter-day Saint missionaries to New Zealand;
 that on December 7, 1941, Japanese aircraft pilots attempted to bomb or strafe the church's Laie Hawaii Temple just prior to or just after the attack on Pearl Harbor, but were prevented from doing so by mechanical failures or an unseen protective force, and that the Japanese pilot who attempted to bomb or strafe the Laie Hawaii Temple was converted to the LDS Church after he saw a picture of the temple in the possession of Latter-day Saint missionaries in Japan;

Temples
Although there is a sparse population, and great distances to travel, the Oceania region has a number of church temples due to the significant numbers of members in many countries.

There are also temples in the Philippines and Australia.

|}

Demographics

Book of Mormon translations

 1855, Hawaiian language translation of the Book of Mormon, which was the first translation of the Book of Mormon to be published in a non-European language.
 1889: Māori edition. 
 1903: Samoan edition.
 1904: Tahitian edition. 
 1946: Tongan edition.
 1965: Rarotongan edition.
 1980: Fijian edition.
 1981: Niuean edition (selections)
 1987: Pohnpeian, Micronesian languages (selections).
 1988: Palauan edition.
 1989: Chamorro edition.
 2001: Gilbertese (Kiribati) edition.
 2002: Tok Pisin edition. 
 2003: Marshallese edition.
 2004: Bislama edition.
 2004: Yapese edition.
 2015: Kosraean edition, Micronesian languages.
 2015: Chuukese/Trukese edition, Micronesian languages.

Portrayals in media
Johnny Lingo
The Other Side of Heaven
The Legend of Johnny Lingo, a remake of the 1968 film.

Notable Pacific Islander Latter-day Saints

LDS Church members from indigenous groups:

Political Figures
 Princess 'Elisiva Fusipala Vaha'i of Tonga
 William Sio, New Zealand MP
 Elizabeth Kikkert, ACT MLA

Artists
 Naomi Kahoilua Wilson
 The Jets, Tongan American pop and R&B family band
 Dinah Jane, member of pop group 5th Harmony

Athletes

 Sid Going, All Blacks captain, and player for NZ Maori.
 Ken Going, All Blacks player, member of the NZ national side on the 1974 tour of Ireland.  
 Jonah Lomu, joined the Church in 2012, 3 years before his passing
 Valerie Adams, Tongan, New Zealand Shot Putter world champion, Olympic and Commonwealth Gold Medalist
 Willie Brown
 Tony Finau, PGA Tour professional golfer
 Pearl Going, NZ mountaineer.
 William Hopoate, Prominent NRL Bulldogs player.
 John Hopoate
 Todd Miller
 Ken Niumatalolo, Coach of the Navy Midshipmen football team
 Brendon Pongia, New Zealand basketball player
 Jordan Rapana, NRL Canberra Raiders, NZ and Cook Island national teams
 Sam Perrett, NRL Sydney Roosters and Bulldogs
 Lloyd Perrett, NRL Bulldogs and Manly Sea Eagles
 Leilani Rorani, Former NZ squash player
 Vai Sikahema, Tongan, NFL player
 Kalani Sitake, Coach of the Brigham Young University Cougars football team
 Nooa Takooa, sprinter.
 Saimoni Tamani, Fiji Olympian and Commonwealth Games bronze medalist, South Pacific Games gold medalist
 Manti Te'o, Samoan NFL player from Hawaii

See also
 List of Mormon missionary diarists (Pacific)
 LDS membership statistics in Oceania

References